Charles-Félix-Hyacinthe Gouhier, comte de Charencey (November 8, 1832 in Paris – March 12, 1916 at the Château of Champ-Thierry in Saint-Maurice-lès-Charencey), was a French philologist.

A member of a very old Norman family, which had eleven branches, Charencey divided his life between politics and scholarship. With passion for his chosen field of philology, he rarely was far from his vast library, from which his own erudite works emerged. He was elected as a member of the American Philosophical Society in 1872.

He was the founder of the Philological Society and the society of Saint-Jérôme, which published grammars, catechisms, and dictionaries for missionaries. In 1888, he became president of the Société de Linguistique de Paris.

His œuvre was considerable. He was most interested in American languages and the Basque language, for which he wrote a dictionary, which was never printed. He focused above all on the practical description of little-known languages, and he was equally interested in mythology, paleography, folklore, and history.

References

 

Basque-language scholars
Writers from Normandy
French philologists
1832 births
1916 deaths